Daria Stanislavovna Voit (née Pustovoitova, ; born 11 January 1994) is a Russian chess player who holds the titles of FIDE Master (FM) and Woman Grandmaster (WGM).

Career
In 2014 she won the Russian Junior Girls Championship. The following year, Voit won the women's section of the European Universities Chess Championships in Yerevan. In 2016 she won the Moscow women's blitz championship and the Moscow women's rapid championship. In 2016, in Novosibirsk, Voit tied for 4th-7th places in the Russian Women's Championship Superfinal.

References

External links

Daria Voit chess games at 365Chess.com

1994 births
Living people
Chess FIDE Masters
Chess woman grandmasters
Chess Olympiad competitors
Russian female chess players
Sportspeople from Moscow